(Ivan) Jean Gottmann (10 October 1915, in Kharkov – 28 February 1994, in Oxford) was a French geographer who was best known for his seminal study on the urban region of the Northeast megalopolis. His main contributions to human geography were in the sub-fields of urban, political, economic, historical and regional geography. His regional specializations ranged from France and the Mediterranean to the United States, Israel, and Japan.

Early years
Gottmann was born in Kharkov, Ukraine, Russian Empire. He was the only child of prosperous Jewish parents, Elie Gottmann and Sonia-Fanny Ettinger, who were killed in February 1918, following the Russian Revolution of 1917. He was de facto adopted by his aunt, Emily Gottmann and uncle, Michel Berchin, and escaped with them to Paris in 1921 via Constantinople. It is there he changed the Eastern European Iona to the French cognate "Jean."

Career
Gottmann started out as a research assistant in economic geography at the Sorbonne (1937–41) under the guidance of Albert Demangeon, but was forced to leave his post with the Nazi invasion of France and the 1940 Statute of Jews which banned him from public employment. He found refuge in the United States, where he received a Rockefeller Foundation fellowship to attend the Institute for Advanced Study in Princeton, New Jersey, in the seminar of Edward M. Earle. During the war, he contributed also to the U.S. effort by consulting for the Board of Economic Warfare in Washington and other agencies; he also joined La France Libre and the exiled French academic community teaching at the New School for Social Research. Isaiah Bowman hired him as a non-tenured professor at his new institute of geography of the Johns Hopkins University (1943–48). In 1945 he returned to France to work for the French Ministry of the Economy, and he also spent two years as director of research at the United Nations (1946–47).

After the war, he started to commute between France and the United States in an effort to explain America's human geography to the French public and Europe's to the American. His multicultural perspective allowed him to get a grant from Paul Mellon to produce the first regional study of Virginia (1953–55) and financial support from The Century Foundation to study the megalopolis of the North-Eastern seaboard of the United States, which soon became a paradigm in urban geography and planning to define polynuclear global city-regions.

In 1957 he married Bernice Adelson. In 1961, he was invited to join the École des Hautes Études en Sciences Sociales in Paris by Fernand Braudel, Claude Lévi-Strauss, and Alexandre Koyré and in 1968 became Professor of Geography and Head of Department at the School of Geography at the University of Oxford (1968–1983). In the 1980s, Gottman wrote numerous essays to develop his ideas about ‘transactional’ cities whose primary economic function is the processing and distribution of information.  After retiring as emeritus professor he remained in Oxford until the end of his life.

Beyond his contribution to the study of megalopolis and to urban geography, his theoretical work on the political partitioning of geographical space as a result of the interplay between movement flows and symbolic systems (iconographies) has been rediscovered after his death.

Awards
Gottmann was awarded an Honorary Fellowship from the American Geographical Society in 1956, and its Charles P. Daly Medal in 1964. In 1980 he received the Victoria Medal of the Royal Geographical Society. He also was a fellow of the American Academy of Arts and Sciences and the British Academy.

Bibliography
Jean Gottmann's bibliography lists about 400 references. The following list is a selection of some of his most relevant books and papers:

 L'homme, la route et l'eau en Asie sud-occidentale (1938)
 De la méthode d'analyse en géographie humaine, Annales de Géographie (1947)
 L'Amerique (1949)
 A geography of Europe (1950, 1969)
 La politique des Etats et leur géographie (1952)
 Virginia at mid-Century (1955)
 Les marchés des matières premières (1957)
 Etudes sur l'Etat d'Israel (1958)
 Megalopolis: The Urbanized Northeastern Seaboard of the United States (1961)
 Essais sur l'amenagement de l'espace habité (1966)
 The significance of territory (1973)
 Centre and Periphery (1980)
 La città invincibile (1983)
 Since Megalopolis (1990)
 Beyond Megalopolis (1994)

See also 
Megalopolis (city type)
 Geographers on Film

References

General
 Muscarà Luca (2003), "The Long Road to Megalopolis", Ekistics, vol. 70, n.418-9, pp. 23–35, 
 Muscarà Luca (2005), "Territory as a Psychosomatic Device: Gottmann’s Kinetic Political Geography", Geopolitics, 10, pp. 24–49, 
 Muscarà Luca (1998), "The Complete Bibliography of Jean Gottmann", Cybergeo: European Journal of Geography, Document 64,  
 Oxford Dictionary of National Biography

1915 births
1994 deaths
French geographers
White Russian emigrants to France
Urban geographers
Fellows of the British Academy
Johns Hopkins University faculty
University of Paris alumni
Fellows of the American Academy of Arts and Sciences
Emigrants from the Russian Empire to France
The Century Foundation
Victoria Medal recipients
Jewish Ukrainian social scientists
20th-century geographers